The Bishop of the Ozarks is a 1923 American drama silent film directed by Finis Fox. The film is based on a story by Milford W. Howard, who both produced and starred in the feature. The film was distributed by Film Booking Offices of America, commonly referred to as FBO. The film is presumed lost.

Synopsis

Cast
Milford W. Howard – Roger Chapman and Tom Sullivan
Derelys Perdue – Margery Chapman
Cecil Holland – Dr. Earl Godfrey
William Kenton – Dr. Paul Burroughs
R.D. MacLean – Governor of Alabama
Mrs. Milo Adams – Shepherd woman
Rosa Melville – Mrs. Jack Armstead
Fred Kelsey – Mart Stoneman
George Reed – Simon

Background
Milford W. Howard, who wrote and produced the film, was a United States representative from Alabama from 1894 to 1898, before moving to California in 1918. While still in Alabama, Howard wrote If Christ Came to Congress (1894), an exposé of corruption, published again in 1964, and The American Plutocracy (1895), a novel about "two classes of people...the excessively rich and the abject poor". According to the Cedar Rapids Tribune (April 6, 1923), the screenplay was due to be published as a novel following the picture's release. Howard returned to Alabama in 1923, and after the death of his first wife, he remarried and traveled to Europe where he interviewed Benito Mussolini of Italy. The interview altered his political philosophy, causing him to endorse fascism. Howard's last book published was Fascism: A Challenge to Democracy, in 1928.

The Bishop of the Ozarks was the only film produced by the Cosmopolitan Film Company, not to be confused with Cosmopolitan Films or Cosmopolitan Productions. Copyright documents on file at the Library of Congress show the film was registered by the R-C (Robertson-Cole) Pictures Corporation, which has been suggested was the holding company of Cosmopolitan.

Cecil Holland, who portrayed Dr. Godfrey, went on to become one of the earliest makeup-men in Hollywood. Holland's work in makeup can be seen in The Mask of Fu Manchu (1932), and The Wizard of Oz (1939). Holland would later head up the makeup department at Metro-Goldwyn-Mayer, and also authored the book, The Art of Make-up for Stage and Screen.

Reviews and reception
A review in Moving Picture World at the time said of the film, "mysticism has been resorted to in several instances. There is a spiritual seance, a persistent strain of mental telepathy and a definite instance in which the occult powers of evil are demonstrated". The Exhibitors Herald opined that the film was "an odd mixture of prison reform, second sight and crook reformation", and noted that Milford's acting was "stilted and unreal and at no time does it get over very forcibly". A review of the film in the 1923 Exhibitor's Trade Review said the feature was "an extremely entertaining picture...in spite of the fact that films which suggest a religious atmosphere are seldom viewed with favor by the average citizen in search of amusement...in the present instance there is no propaganda developed regarding any particular belief, no attempt at preaching, merely a thoroughly human story, shot through with trenchant dramatic punches and, if there is a moral to be traced, it is simply that it pays in the long run to do the right thing and keep your nerve intact".

See also
Lost film
List of lost films

References

External links

1923 films
American silent feature films
Silent American drama films
Lost American films
Film Booking Offices of America films
American black-and-white films
1923 drama films
1923 lost films
Lost drama films
Films directed by Finis Fox
1920s American films
Films set in the Ozarks